Sidney Lacy Richard Foss (28 November 1912 – 3 August 1995), commonly known as Dick Foss or Dickie Foss, was an English professional footballer who played as a left half in the Football League for Chelsea, with whom he had a 30-year association. He later served as youth team manager at the club.

Personal life 
Foss was in a reserved occupation during the Second World War. He was a member of the Police War Reserve and was called up prior to the commencement of hostilities.

Career statistics

References 

1912 births
1995 deaths
Footballers from Barking, London
English footballers
Association football inside forwards
Association football wing halves
Association football midfielders
Thames A.F.C. players
Tottenham Hotspur F.C. players
Enfield F.C. players
Southall F.C. players
Chelsea F.C. players
English Football League players
Brentford F.C. wartime guest players
Chelsea F.C. non-playing staff
Watford F.C. wartime guest players